Koo Bon-sang (born 4 October 1989) is a South Korean footballer who plays as a midfielder.

External links 

1989 births
Living people
People from Yongin
Association football midfielders
South Korean footballers
Incheon United FC players
Ulsan Hyundai FC players
FC Anyang players
Daejeon Hana Citizen FC players
K League 1 players
K League 2 players
K3 League players
Myongji University alumni